Hypericum matangense is a species of shrub in the family Hypericaceae. It is endemic to Ecuador. It has only been collected once, on the páramos of the Andes in 1980.

References

metangense
Endemic flora of Ecuador
Plants described in 1990
Taxonomy articles created by Polbot